State Route 138 (SR 138) is an east–west state highway in the U.S. state of California that generally follows the northern foothills of the San Gabriel Mountains and the western Mojave Desert. The scenic highway begins in the west at its junction with Interstate 5 located south of Gorman in the Sierra Pelona Mountains, continues eastward through the Antelope Valley and Cajon Pass, to its junction with State Route 18 in the east, located in the San Bernardino Mountains south of Crestline. 

Except for the western  of the route between Interstate 5 and just east of Gorman Post Road and a segment shared with State Route 14 between Avenue D in Lancaster and Palmdale Boulevard in Palmdale, it is all a mostly undivided two-lane surface road. The remaining section of the Ridge Route, California's first highway connecting the San Joaquin Valley to the Los Angeles Basin, ends at Route 138 near Gorman.

Route description
The western leg of State Route 138 traverses the Lancaster Freeway from Interstate 5 to Gorman Post Road, Lancaster Road from Gorman Post Road to 245th Street West near Neenach School, and Avenue D from 245th Street West to Route 138's north junction with State Route 14. The Lancaster Freeway has four lanes, two for each direction of travel. Both Lancaster Road and Avenue D are 2-lane conventional roads; Avenue D is on a straight alignment over its  between 245th Street West and State Route 14.

After its co-routing with the Antelope Valley Freeway (SR 14) for approximately  through Lancaster and Palmdale, it passes through Palmdale's eastside as four-lane Palmdale Boulevard, 47th Street East, and Fort Tejon Road to Avenue T. At Avenue T it tapers to two lanes and continues straight ahead on Pearblossom Highway through Littlerock, Pearblossom, and Llano to its west junction with State Route 18.  Route 18's western terminus siphons off Las Vegas-bound travelers from 138. At its west junction with State Route 18, State Route 138 turns southeast on Antelope Highway to the Los Angeles/San Bernardino County line where it loses its alternative name, Antelope Highway.

Between the county line and Interstate 15, State Route 138 traverses very mountainous and scenic terrain and it connects with State Route 2 that leads to winter resort areas in the San Gabriel Mountains used largely by residents of the Los Angeles metropolitan area. State Route 138 then descends through the West Cajon Valley and crosses Interstate 15 in the Cajon Pass. From  Interstate 15 to State Route 173, near the northwest corner of Silverwood Lake, traffic on State Route 138 is rather sparse. The remaining road past Silverwood Lake is mountainous, narrow, and twisting, and not a prime mountain route to the San Bernardino Mountain resorts. The entire segment from Interstate 15 to the eastern terminus of State Route 138 at Mount Anderson Junction is known as the El Cajon-Skyline Forest Highway. State Route 138 and 18 overlap each other in opposing termini, as SR 18's northwest most endpoint is in Llano with SR 138, while SR 138's southmost point is in Crestline with SR 18.

Because of its twisting, mountainous segments and overloaded traffic conditions on its eastern leg, State Route 138 east of Palmdale and west of Interstate 15 is the site of numerous serious auto accidents as of 2004, according to CHP data. One of the chief contributors to accidents on Route 138 of late is drivers passing on the two-lane highway in unsafe conditions. A notable accident in 2003 involved a pickup truck driven by an unlicensed driver leaving the roadway and plunging into the California Aqueduct, killing four occupants of the vehicle and leaving the sole survivor quadriplegic. The State of California paid a $10 million settlement to the victims' family. The area surrounding the highway is also prone to brush fires and flash floods.

SR 138 is part of the California Freeway and Expressway System, and west of the western junction of SR 18 is part of the National Highway System, a network of highways that are considered essential to the country's economy, defense, and mobility by the Federal Highway Administration. SR 138 is eligible to be included in the State Scenic Highway System, but it is not officially designated as a scenic highway by the California Department of Transportation.

The segment of SR 138 from I-15 in the Cajon Pass to SR 18 at Crestline is designated as part of the Rim of the World Scenic Byway, a  National Forest Scenic Byway.

Future
A project to widen the highway to four lanes and add shoulders between Avenue T in Palmdale and Highway 18 in Llano was announced by the California Department of Transportation (Caltrans) in 2009. Work was projected to be completed by Spring 2012. However, as of December 2012, work on the project was still ongoing and several portions remain two lanes. Improvements to the  stretch between Highway 18 and the Los Angeles/San Bernardino County Line, including widening the shoulders and installing rumble strips, were proposed in February 2013, with no timeline for completion being given.

A proposed bypass to the north of downtown Palmdale has been studied by Caltrans. The bypass would be located east of the Antelope Valley Freeway and south of LA/Palmdale Regional Airport along Avenue P-8, reconnecting with the current SR 138 east of Palmdale.

Caltrans plans to build a  freeway and transit corridor parallel to State Route 138 and State Route 18, known as the "High Desert Corridor". The $8 billion project would include an eight-lane freeway between Lancaster and Victorville, along with a bikeway, rapid transit, and part of Brightline West, a proposed high-speed rail line linking Los Angeles to Las Vegas. However, Caltrans put the freeway on hold in 2019.

Major intersections

In popular culture
Parts of the distinctive highway were used in the filming of the movie The Long, Long Trailer, a 1954 comedy with Lucille Ball and Desi Arnaz. Despite the rapid growth of Southern California in the ensuing fifty years, the segment shown in the movie is little changed since the movie was filmed.

David Hockney composed the picturesque photographic collage Pearblossom Highway in 1986 off the segment of Route 138 bearing that moniker. It may be viewed at the Getty Museum in Los Angeles.

See also

References

External links

 California @ AARoads.com - State Route 138
 Caltrans: Route 138 highway conditions
 California Highways: SR 138
 
 Pearblossom Highway (1986)

138
State Route 138
State Route 138
Antelope Valley
Mojave Desert
San Bernardino Mountains
San Gabriel Mountains
Sierra Pelona Ridge
Hesperia, California
Lancaster, California
Transportation in Palmdale, California